On the Edge is the second album by the speed metal band Iron Fire released in March 2001. The album was produced and mixed by Tommy Hansen (famous for his work with Helloween).

Track listing
"Eternal Damnation" - 1:11
"The End of It All" - 4:09
"Prince of Agony" - 4:49
"On the Edge" - 3:45
"Into the Abyss" - 4:18
"Thunderspirit" - 3:26
"Wanted Man" - 4:07
"Lost n' Alone" - 5:10
"Forever Evil" - 2:41
"Here and Alive" - 4:26
"Miracle" - 4:29
"The Price of Blood" - 4:33

All music & lyrics by: Martin Steene,
except track #1 by: Tommy Hansen

On the song "Prince of Agony", the quote at the very start of the song is the catchphrase of Pinhead, one of the Cenobites in the Hellraiser films.

Album line-up
 Martin Steene  - Vocals
 Kristian Martinsen - Guitars
 Martin Slott - Guitars
 Jakob Lykkebo - Bass
 Morten Plenge - Drums

Guest Musician
Tommy Hansen - Keyboards / Harmonica / Backing Vocals

References

2001 albums
Iron Fire albums
Noise Records albums